Mark Simanton is a retired American soccer midfielder who spent his entire professional career with the Chicago Sting.

Simanton graduated from New Trier West High School.  He attended the Indiana University where he played on the men's soccer team from 1976 to 1979.

In 1980, Simanton turned professional with the Chicago Sting of the North American Soccer League.  He would remain with the Sting for his entire career which consisted of five outdoor seasons, two NASL indoor seasons and four seasons in the Major Indoor Soccer League.  During these years, the Sting won both the 1981 and 1984 NASL titles.  In 1987, Simanton publicly criticized the Sting for hiring Erich Geyer as head coach.  He became a free agent that summer and refused to sign with the Sting.  He then became a vice-president of Huron Partners, a real estate development company.  He also served as a broadcast analyst for Sting games.

References

External links
 NASL stats

1956 births
Living people
Soccer players from Chicago
American soccer players
Chicago Sting (MISL) players
Chicago Sting (NASL) players
Indiana Hoosiers men's soccer players
Major Indoor Soccer League (1978–1992) players
North American Soccer League (1968–1984) indoor players
North American Soccer League (1968–1984) players
Association football midfielders
Major Indoor Soccer League (1978–1992) commentators